Artistic swimming (known as synchronised swimming until 2017) has been an event at the Summer Olympics since the 1984 Games. The current Olympic program has competition in duet and team events, but in past games there was also a solo event.  The United States, Canada and Japan have traditionally been the strongest nations in the sport, winning the Olympic medals from 1984 through 1996, but Russia has recently dominated, winning every event between 2000 and 2020.

Summary

Events

Medal table
As of the conclusion of the 2020 Olympics, 9 NOCs have won Olympic medals across 19 events. The Women's solo event at the 1992 Olympics saw a tie for first place, with no silver presented.

Nations and number of national participants

See also
 List of Olympic venues in synchronized swimming

References

External links
 International Olympic Committee results database

 
Olympics
Sports at the Summer Olympics